The Commonwealth Wrestling Championship is a tournament designed for top wrestlers in the Commonwealth of Nations. It is not linked to the Commonwealth Games, nor has any accreditation with any sports body in any country.

Edizioni

Łącznie medale (1985–2017)

Glasgow 1985 
The 1985 Commonwealth Wrestling Championships were held in Glasgow, Scotland.

London 2003 
The 2003 Commonwealth Wrestling Championships were held in London, Ontario, Canada.

Cape Town 2010 
The 2005 Commonwealth Wrestling Championships were held in Cape Town, South Africa, from 30 June to 2 July 2005.

120KG-Greco-Roma

1st Gold Markus Dekker
2nd Silver Palwinder Singh Cheema
3rd Bronze Yuri Reichel
4th Karl Gehringer

London 2007 
The 2007 Commonwealth Wrestling Championships were held in London, Ontario, Canada on 16–17 June 2007.  Participating nations included Canada, India, Pakistan, Great Britain, South Africa, and Namibia.

Jalandhar 2009 
The 2009 Commonwealth Wrestling Championships were held in Jalandhar, Punjab, India, between 18 and 20 December 2009. Originally it was slated to be a test event for the Delhi 2010 commonwealth games in Delhi but the venue was not ready. Wrestlers competed in Freestyle and Greco-Roman wrestling the latter being only for Men.

Greco-Roman

Melbourne 2011 

The 2011 Commonwealth Wrestling Championships were held in Melbourne, Australia.

Johannesburg 2013 

The 2013 Commonwealth Wrestling Championships were held in Johannesburg, South Africa, on 5–7 December 2013.

Singapore 2016

Johannesburg 2017  
The 2017 Commonwealth Wrestling Championships were held in Johannesburg, South Africa between 15 and 17 December 2017. 

It was streamed live by DigiComms from Carnival City in Brakpan.

References

Wrestling
Wrestling competitions